Count François Xavier Jean-Marie de Robiano (23 December 1778 – 6 July 1836) was a Belgian politician and art collector. He was the first governor of the province of Antwerp after the independence of Belgium in 1830.

Political career
François de Robiano was a member of the National Congress of Belgium from 1830 until 1831. He was senator in the Belgian Senate from 1831 until 1836 and governor of Antwerp from 4 October 1830 until 7 April 1831.

Sources
 Steve Heylen, Bart De Nil, Bart D’hondt, Sophie Gyselinck, Hanne Van Herck en Donald Weber, Geschiedenis van de provincie Antwerpen. Een politieke biografie, Antwerpen, Provinciebestuur Antwerpen, 2005, Vol. 2 p. 62

Members of the National Congress of Belgium
1778 births
1836 deaths
Governors of Antwerp Province
Art collectors from Antwerp